Count d'Orsay may refer to:

Pierre Grimod du Fort (1692—1748), fermier général and art collector under Louis XV
Pierre Gaspard Marie Grimod d'Orsay (1748—1809), art collector
Albert Gaspard Grimod  (1772–1843), Bonapartist general and nobleman
Alfred Guillaume Gabriel, Count D'Orsay (1801–1852), French amateur artist, dandy, and man of fashion

See also
 Orsay